Akbarieh Garden is a UNESCO World Heritage Site in Birjand, South Khorasan Province, Iran (WHS 1372-009). It was inscribed on the UNESCO World Heritage List in 2011. It annually receives thousands of domestic and foreign tourists. It is concomitantly used as a museum and tourist space.

History
The Akbarieh Garden was built in the Qajar era by Heshmat ol-Molk I, the governor of Qohestan and Sistan in 1880. As with most gardens in history, the Garden was originally constructed by Heshmat ol-Molk I to adorn his property. During the early 20th century, in the late Qajar era, Heshmat ol-Molk I used the garden as his official ruling office. The Akbarieh Garden, as the Qohestan Government House, for the remainder of the Qajar era all the way until 1978 during the late Pahlavi period, functioned as the residence of local rulers. It was the site for celebrations and feasts in the attendance of domestic and foreign guests. In addition to functioning as a residential garden, it was also used for receptions, meetings and negotiations with foreign diplomatic missions such as consulates.

The Garden's last owner, Asadollah Alam, bequeathed it upon Astan Quds Razavi in his will. However, since 1992, the garden's specialised management and maintenance is under the supervision of the Iranian Ministry of Cultural Heritage, Handicrafts and Tourism.

References

Birjand
World Heritage Sites in Iran
Parks in Iran
Persian gardens in Iran
Tourist attractions in South Khorasan Province
Buildings and structures in South Khorasan Province
Buildings of the Qajar period